John Joseph Farrell (June 16, 1892 – March 24, 1918) was an American baseball player, playing as a second baseman in Major League Baseball. He died in Chicago, Illinois after suffering from pneumonia.

References

External links

 

1892 births
1918 deaths
Chicago Whales players
Major League Baseball second basemen
Fremont Pathfinders players
Chicago Keeleys players
Baseball players from Chicago
Deaths from pneumonia in Illinois